Anita Brägger (born 6 October 1972 in Altdorf) is a retired Swiss middle-distance runner who competed mostly in the 800 metres. She represented her country at the 2004 Summer Olympics failing to qualify for the semifinals. In addition, she competed at three World Championships, in 1999, 2001 and 2003, reaching semifinals twice.

Her husband is another Olympic athlete, Christian Belz.

Competition record

Personal bests
Outdoor
400 metres – 53.26 (Genève 2001)
600 metres – 1:27.63 (Langenthal 1999)
800 metres – 1:59.66 (Lausanne 2001)
1000 metres – 2:40.00 (Rovereto 2002)
1500 metres – 4:19.52 (Bern 2001)
Indoor
800 metres – 2:04.15 (Karlsruhe 2000)
1000 metres – 2:45.90 (Liévin 2005)

References

1972 births
Living people
Swiss female middle-distance runners
Athletes (track and field) at the 2004 Summer Olympics
Olympic athletes of Switzerland